The Assassin is a 1961 Italian crime film directed by Elio Petri. It is the feature film debut of Petri. It was entered into the 11th Berlin International Film Festival.

Plot
Early one morning at an expensive apartment in Rome, the police arrest Alfredo, a good-looking bachelor who runs an upmarket antique business selling fakes. The charge is murder: Adalgisa, his wealthy former mistress, has been found dead in a seaside hotel. Alfredo is dumbfounded, since he had visited her that night to ask for more time to repay a loan and they had made love, but he would never have dreamed of killing her. 

His life becomes a nightmare as the police stick regardless to their theory, interrogating him endlessly and probing into his past life. He comes to see that the existence he had never examined before was founded on egoism and lies. His relationships with his widowed mother, with his innocent fiancée, with the customers he cheated, and with the dead Adalgisa were all hollowed out by his superficiality and selfishness. 

Next morning the police release him into the street, realising at last that he is innocent of the murder. But all his other problems remain.

Cast

Release
The Assassin was released on April 1, 1961. It was distributed by Titanus.

References

References

External links

1961 films
1960s crime thriller films
Giallo films
Italian crime thriller films
Italian black-and-white films
1960s Italian-language films
Films directed by Elio Petri
Films with screenplays by Tonino Guerra
1961 directorial debut films
1960s Italian films